Chrome 20 Series is a graphics accelerator by S3 Graphics, the successor of GammaChrome S18.

Overview
The Chrome 20 series was introduced on March 11, 2005, with the Chrome S25 and Chrome S27 as launch products.  Similar to the GammaChrome S18 PCI Express which preceded it, S20 was marketed to the low and mid range of the graphics card market, with the Chromotion 3 Video Engine and low power consumption as main selling points.

The S20 series marked S3's first products utilizing Fujitsu's 90 nm process. This enabled a significant increase in clock speeds over prior S3 products, and the Chrome 20 series could use 32-256MiB GDDR1 or GDDR3 memory at maximum if 700 MHz, or 64-512MiB GDDR2 memory at a maximum of 500 MHz. The S20 was also S3's first GDDR3 enabled product - with the memory interface supporting 32, 64, or 128-bit of GDDR1, GDDR2 or GDDR3 memory.

Similar to Radeon X1000 series, texturing units and raster operators are separated from pixel shaders. Chrome 20 has 4 vertex shaders, 8 pixel shaders, 4 texturing units, 4 raster operators.

Display controller now integrates a single-link TMDS transmitter, with support of dual-link using external transmitters.

Other new features supports the multi-GPU technology MultiChrome and AcceleRAM.

Chromotion 3.0
This revision of Chromotion Engine adds support of nonlinear video scaling, commonly used by wide screen television sets. TV encoder now supports 18 DTV ATSC formats:

MultiChrome
MultiChrome is a technique to couple multiple graphics chips for better performance. It was first used in the Chrome S20 series and later in Chrome 400 series graphics processors. The methods used by MultiChome are Alternate frame rendering and Split Frame Rendering. The technology is comparable to NVidia's SLI and ATi/AMD's Crossfire multi video adapter solution.

At the moment, due to the speed of the Chrome S20 and Chrome 400 chipsets, no special connectors are required to bridge both cards to activate MultiChrome. Also, unlike NVidia or ATi's solution, the technology is not locked to a particular chipset.

AcceleRAM
AcceleRAM feature allows the graphics card to cache data to the system memory if more is needed, similar to HyperMemory.

Chrome S27

Chrome S27 is currently the flagship series for Chrome S20. It is targeted at the low to mid end of the graphics card market. Another main selling point is its very low power consumption and thus heat output even with comparison to similarly targeted graphics cards from NVIDIA and ATI making it suitable for HTPC setups. Its memory uses either DDR1, DDR2 or GDDR3 with 128mb or 256mb flavours. The core runs at 700 MHz.

Chrome S25

Chrome S25 is a lower speed version, running at 600 MHz core and 400 MHz memory. It is targeted at the low end of the graphics card desktop market. The processor consumes at low as 9W of power. Chrome S25 is advertised to support AcceleRAM. MultiChrome is supported.

Chrome XMS20 Series
Chrome 20 Series mobile, or Chrome XMS20 Series, is the mobile variant of Chrome S20 series, which has integrated 64 or 128MiB 64bit GDDR3 SDRAM as multi-package module, integrated 2 channel LVDS transmitter.  Power management features include dynamic clock gating, panel lighting control. Products include Chrome XMS25, Chrome XMS27, with ultra low power versions of the processor available.

Retail products
As of May 2006, most of the Chrome S27s available in retail are made by S3 Graphics itself. The Chrome S27 is sold at the company's own GStore where it is sold alongside a 128MiB version and a Gammachrome S18 Pro and certain online retailers like Newegg. However, they can be bought as a 256mb DDR2 (clocked at 800 MHz) version in China under the Axper brand and a 256MiB DDR3 (clocked at 1200 MHz version in Japan under the brand XIAi.

Although S3 graphics does not sell Chrome S25 video cards, they can be found under the Xiai brand in Japan and the Axper brand in China. Both these cards have their GPU clockspeed and memory clocked 100 mHz higher than the default specification giving a 700 MHz memory and 500 MHz GPU clock speeds.

Clock Speed Record
The Chrome S27 in May 2006, held the record for the highest GPU clockspeed of 700 MHz. However, performance does not depend on clock speed alone allowing it to be beaten by lower clocked cards.

References

External links
Chrome S20 series page
S3 Graphics Unveils Chrome S20 Series PCI Express Graphics Processors
S3 Graphic's Gstore (online store)
XIAi's Chrome S27 page
Xbit labs review
ExtremeTech review
Tech Report MultiChrome review
TechSpot Chrome S25 and Chrome S27 overview
 Chrome-Center

Graphics cards